Flat Iron is a small, unincorporated community in Highland Township, Vermillion County, in the U.S. state of Indiana.

Geography
Flat Iron is an Unincorporated community located at  (40.052930, -87.489130).  State Road 32, County Road 100W ("Flat Iron Road") and County Road 1150N come together at this point to enclose a triangular, iron-shaped area of flat ground, giving the site its name.  A house and a pole barn occupy the site, along with a sign reading, "Flat Iron, population 1." In the past the site had an additional residence and a general store, and a population of six. Highland Airport, which closed in the late 1980s, was located just across the field to the north and east of Flat Iron. The closest incorporated town is Perrysville, approximately three miles east. The unincorporated town of Gessie is about two miles north.

References

Unincorporated communities in Vermillion County, Indiana
Unincorporated communities in Indiana
Terre Haute metropolitan area